Mark Lucovsky is an American software developer who is now employed by Google after resigning his role as General Manager of Operating Systems at Facebook. Prior to this, he worked at Microsoft and VMware. He is noted for being a part of the team that designed and built the Windows NT operating system, which, after Windows XP, became the basis of all current Windows releases.

Lucovsky earned his bachelor's degree in computer science in 1983 from California Polytechnic State University, San Luis Obispo. He worked at Digital Equipment Corporation, where he came to the attention of Dave Cutler and Lou Perazzoli.  When Cutler and Perazzoli moved to Microsoft to work on their next generation operating system after the cancellation of the PRISM and MICA projects at Digital, they asked him to join them.

Among his contributions to Windows NT was an eighty-page manual that he wrote with Steve R. Wood defining the Windows application programming interfaces for software developers working on the Windows NT platform. He also managed check-ins to the Windows NT source code, tracking each check-in and discussing it with the developer before allowing it to be committed. Lucovsky was instrumental in moving the Windows team from the homegrown SLM revision control system to a custom version of Perforce (SourceDepot).

Lucovsky has stated that Steve Ballmer, on being informed that Lucovsky was about to leave Microsoft for Google, picked up a chair and threw it across his office, hitting a table. Lucovsky also described Ballmer as saying: "Fucking Eric Schmidt is a fucking pussy. I'm going to fucking bury that guy, I have done it before, and I will do it again. I'm going to fucking kill Google," then resumed trying to persuade Lucovsky to stay at Microsoft. Ballmer has described this as a "gross exaggeration of what actually took place."

Lucovsky worked on the Microsoft .NET My Services product (codenamed Hailstorm) prior to moving to Google. At Google, he served as a Technical Director for the Ajax Search API. He joined VMware in July 2009.

References

External links 
 Man Survives Steve Ballmer's Flying Chair To Build '21st Century Linux' - Wired article (November, 2011)
 Markl's Thoughts - Mark's weblog on Blogger
 Windows, A Software Engineering Odyssey - a talk Mark gave at the 4th Usenix Windows Systems Symposium (August, 2000)

Microsoft employees
American bloggers
Living people
Microsoft Windows people
Google employees
Year of birth missing (living people)